Alexander Mikhailovich Mervart (real first name was Gustav Hermann Christian Meerwarth) (1884–1932) was born at Bruchsal/Germany, became a Russian indologist, ethnographer, linguist and the first Russian dravidologist.

Career 
In 1913, Mervart was appointed head of the Indian department at the Museum of Anthropology & Ethnography. In 1914–1918, he and his wife explored much of the territory of South India and Ceylon, and visited Malaya, Singapore and Indonesia. As a result of this expedition, Mervart managed to assemble a large and unique collection of artefacts and objects of folk art from all over South and Southeast Asia. Upon his return to Leningrad, Mervart became the keeper of the Museum of Anthropology & Ethnography (1924-1930) and a teacher at the Leningrad State University, where he would be the first one in Russia to introduce the course of the Tamil language to the curriculum. In 1926–1929, Mervart published around 20 scientific works (including two monographs) and numerous articles.

In December 1929, according to other sources (Memorial), on 13 January 1930 he was arrested on trumped-up charges in the Academics' Case, accused of espionage and on 8 August 1931 sentenced to five years of imprisonment by the OGPU Collegium. Alexander Mervart was sent to the Ukhtinsko-Pechorsky Labor Camp.

He died at Utpetchlager on 23 May 1932.

Mervart, Alexander
Mervart, Alexander
Mervart, Alexander
1884 births
1932 deaths
Russian Indologists
Dravidologists
German emigrants to Russia
Writers from Mannheim
20th-century linguists
German people who died in Soviet detention
People convicted of spying